Robert Foglesong (born February 8, 1987) is an American soccer player.

Career

Youth and College
Foglesong attended Stafford Senior High School, where he won three All-District first team honors, and was an All-Region first team, All-Metro, and All-State Honorable Mention honors during senior season, before playing four years of college soccer at Old Dominion University.

Having been a member of the Richmond Kickers Super Y-League program for several seasons, Foglesong also played with the Richmond Kickers Future and the Hampton Roads Piranhas in the USL Premier Development League.

Professional
Foglesong turned professional in 2010 when he signed with the Richmond Kickers of the USL Second Division. He made his professional debut on April 24, 2010, in a league match against the Charlotte Eagles, and scored his first professional goal on June 6 in a 3–1 win over Charleston Battery.

References

External links
 Old Dominion bio

1987 births
Living people
American soccer players
Old Dominion Monarchs men's soccer players
Richmond Kickers Future players
Virginia Beach Piranhas players
Richmond Kickers players
USL League Two players
USL Second Division players
USL Championship players
Sportspeople from Fredericksburg, Virginia
Soccer players from Richmond, Virginia
Association football midfielders